Michel Vendelino Schmöller (born November 11, 1987) is a Brazilian footballer who plays as a defensive midfielder for Club Atlético Catarinense.

Career
He started his career playing at Figueirense's youth division. Schmöller left in September 2008 Figueirense and played two games on loan for Atlético-GO, before returning in December 2008.

Schmöller played in Campeonato Brasileiro Série B with Figueirense and Brasiliense before joining Segunda División side Cartagena on a short-term deal in January 2011.

References

External links

Figueirense Futebol Clube

1987 births
Living people
Brazilian footballers
Brazilian expatriate footballers
Brazilian expatriate sportspeople in Spain
Figueirense FC players
Brasiliense Futebol Clube players
FC Cartagena footballers
América Futebol Clube (RN) players
ABC Futebol Clube players
Esporte Clube Internacional de Lages players
Joinville Esporte Clube players
Grêmio Esportivo Brasil players
Clube Atlético Metropolitano players
Atlético Clube Goianiense players
Ituano FC players
Luverdense Esporte Clube players
Clube do Remo players
Centro Sportivo Alagoano players
Esporte Clube Pelotas players
Campeonato Brasileiro Série B players
Campeonato Brasileiro Série C players
Campeonato Brasileiro Série D players
Segunda División players
Association football defenders
Brazilian people of German descent
Association football midfielders